Hanko is a port town and municipality on the south coast of Finland, located  west of Helsinki and  southwest of Ekenäs, the town centre of Raseborg. The town is bilingual, with a majority being Finnish speakers and a strong minority being Swedish speakers.

The skyline of Hanko is dominated by the church and the water tower. Both of them received their current appearance after World War II, as their predecessors were either damaged or destroyed by the Soviet Armed Forces.

Geography
The Hanko Peninsula, on which the city is located, is the southernmost tip of continental Finland. The soil is a sandy moraine, and vegetation consists mainly of pine and low shrubs, mostly Calluna. Hanko is known for its beautiful archipelago.

There are also over 90 small islands and islets within the city limits.

Climate 
Hanko has a humid continental climate (Köppen Dfb), similar to other locations in southern Finland with long, cold winters and short, mild summers with cool nights. Precipitation is very high and common year round.

History

The site was already known by sailors in the 15th century. Petroglyphs from that time are carved into the rock at the  island.

Hanko has a long history of wars and battles. The Battle of Gangut between Swedish and Russian navies was fought in 1714 in the archipelago north of the peninsula. The battle was the first-ever victory of the Russian regular fleet.

The fortification works on the Hanko Peninsula had already been started by the end of the 18th century, when the Swedish constructed three separate forts on the outlying islands. The forts were taken over by Russia in 1809, and were later bombarded by the Royal Navy during the Crimean War and were eventually blown up during the hostilities by their own defenders.

The city was founded in 1874, soon after the Hanko-Hyvinkää railway was inaugurated in 1872. The Imperial Charter for the city was granted by Emperor Alexander II.

In the late 19th and early 20th centuries, Hanko was the port of choice for emigrants leaving Finland for a new life in North America. A memorial statue, showing birds in flight, commemorates this.

In the late 19th century, while Finland was still a Grand Duchy under Russia, Hanko was a popular spa resort for the Russian nobility. Some of the buildings from that period survive, notably the Hanko Casino (which is not a gambling establishment, but a former banquet hall of the spa). It is currently a restaurant. The Hotel Continental (1901) (now the Hotel Regatta) was designed by architect Lars Sonck in the notable Jugendstil style of the time; after falling into disrepair, the hotel was restored to its former glory in 2013.

It was built in 1906 and was the first lighthouse museum in Finland.

Soviet naval base

In the Moscow Peace Treaty that ended the Winter War on 13 March 1940, Hanko was leased to the Soviet Union as a naval base for a period of 30 years. During the Continuation War, Soviet troops were forced to evacuate Hanko in early December 1941. The Soviet Union renounced the lease formally in the Paris peace treaty of 1947. As a curiosity, it can be noted that the short Russo-Finnish front across the base of the peninsula on the Finnish side was held in part by volunteer troops from Sweden. A museum has been established at this location, among the trenches and other remnants of the war.

The role of the Hanko naval base was replaced by Porkkala in the armistice between Finland and the Soviet Union of 19 September 1944, but it was returned to Finland in January 1956.

Events

The Hangon Regatta is a traditional fixture on the Finnish social scene, and is the town's main summer event. Sailing enthusiasts attend to compete, but there are also others, mostly young people, with little or no interest in sailing, who attend only in order to party and drink. The latter constitute the so-called "Regatta tail", which is not appreciated by most of the town's residents.

Other traditional summer activities are the "Tennis Week", the "Sea Horse" riding competitions, the "Summer Theatre" and Hanko Music Festival events.

Several sandy beaches and a multitude of leisure harbors attract tourists during the summer months.

Politics
Results of the 2011 Finnish parliamentary election in Hanko:

Social Democratic Party   29.8%
Swedish People's Party   25.9%
National Coalition Party   13.4%
True Finns   12.8%
Left Alliance   6.3%
Green League   3.8%
Christian Democrats   3.6%
Centre Party   3.0%

Sports

The Hangö IK sports club, founded in 1903, is located in Hanko. The club was It is best known for its football team which has played one season in the Finnish premier division Mestaruussarja, in 1962, and a number of seasons in the second tier Ykkönen. Their home ground is located at the Rukki Arena. The club also has activities in handball, athletics, table tennis and powerlifting.

Notable people
Tapio Wirkkala (1915–1985), designer and sculptor, was born in Hanko

International relations

Twin towns — Sister cities
Hanko is twinned with:

  Gentofte, Denmark  
  Haapsalu, Estonia
  Halmstad, Sweden  
  Stord, Norway

See also
 Bromarv
 Port of Hanko

References

External links 

 Town of Hanko – official website
 
 The Front Museum on the Hanko Peninsula, documenting the wartime lease of Hanko to the USSR
 Details about Hanko and Porkkala leased bases, maps
 Bengtskär Lighthouse
 The Harparskog-line Finnish fortification line at Hanko front during World War II.
 Hanko and its fortifications.
 Pictures from Hanko on Flickr

 
Cities and towns in Finland
Populated coastal places in Finland
Grand Duchy of Finland
Populated places established in 1874
Port cities and towns of the Baltic Sea
Port cities and towns in Finland
Seaside resorts in Finland
1874 establishments in Finland